Shanna Reed (born Shanna Herron; October 30, 1955) is an American dancer and television and movie actress. She is known for playing Polly Cooper McGillis on Major Dad. One of seven siblings, she is the step-daughter of Tommy Reed, the jazz saxophonist and leader of the Tommy Reed Orchestra.

Additional television credits include roles in Promised Land, Beverly Hills, 90210, Touched by an Angel, Cheers, Magnum, P.I., The Colbys, Simon & Simon, Hotel, I Had Three Wives, Knight Rider, T.J. Hooker, Fantasy Island, Texas, and Newhart.

Filmography

References

External links
 
 
Clips from Texas episodes

1955 births
Actresses from Kansas City, Kansas
20th-century American actresses
American television actresses
Living people
21st-century American women